The Philips Videopac+ G7400 is a third-generation home video game console released in limited quantities in 1983, and only in Europe; an American release as the Odyssey³ Command Center was planned but never occurred. The G7400 was the successor to the Philips Videopac G7000, the European counterpart to the American Magnavox Odyssey². The system featured excellently tailored background and foreground graphics.

The G7400 could play three types of games: all normal G7000 games, special G7000 games with additional high-res background graphics that would appear only when played on the G7400, and G7400-only games with high-res sprites and backgrounds.

Odyssey³ 

There were plans to release the G7400 in the United States as the Odyssey³ and later as the Odyssey³ Command Center; the system was demonstrated at the 1983 Consumer Electronics Show, and some prototypes have been found. The Odyssey³ was never released, mostly because company executives concluded that it was not technologically advanced enough to compete in the marketplace. Also, the video game crash of 1983 ended all lingering hopes for a release.

The Odyssey³ was to feature a real mechanical keyboard, unlike the membrane keyboard found in the G7000 and Odyssey², as well as a built-in joystick holder for dual-joystick games. Prototypes for a 300 baud modem and a speech synthesizer are known to have been made, and a laserdisc interface was planned to allow even more advanced games.

Specifications 
 CPU: Intel 8048, 5.91 MHz
 RAM: 6 KB + 192 Byte
 ROM: 1 KB
 Display: 320×238×16 (Intel 8245 for G7000 compatible 128x64 16 color graphics and EF9340+EF9341)
 Audio: 1 channel, 8 sounds
 Input / Output: RF modulator, Péritel/SCART connector (with RGB), joystick port(s), ROM cartridge port
 Expansion
 The Voice – Speech synthesis unit, compatible with G7000
 Chess Module – Increased the G7400's computing power such that it could play chess, also compatible with G7000
 Microsoft BASIC Home Computer Module (C7420) – Similar to above, with the purpose of converting the G7400 into a "real" computer, not compatible with G7000. An additional Z80 CPU with 16 KB RAM and 16 KB ROM.

See also 
 List of Videopac games

References

External links 

Technical data 
Philips G7400 Manual

Videopac + G7400
Third-generation video game consoles
1983 in video gaming
Computer-related introductions in 1983
Products introduced in 1983